Ramthakur College, established in 1967, is a college in Agartala, Tripura. It offers undergraduate courses in arts and sciences. It is affiliated to  Tripura University.

Departments

Science
Chemistry
Physics
Mathematics
Computer Science
Botany
Zoology
Physiology

Arts and Commerce
Bengali
English
Sanskrit
Hindi
History
Political Science
Philosophy
Education
Economics
Kokborok
Pali
Music
Physical Education
Commerce

Accreditation
The college is recognized by the University Grants Commission (UGC).

See also
Education in India
Education in Tripura
Tripura University
Literacy in India
List of institutions of higher education in Tripura

References

External links

Colleges affiliated to Tripura University
Educational institutions established in 1967
Universities and colleges in Tripura
1967 establishments in Tripura
Colleges in Tripura